Panchikawatta is a suburb of Colombo, Sri Lanka and is part of the area numbered Colombo 10. Its postcode is 01000. Panchikawatte is known for spares and motor parts. The Tower Hall is located here. A majority of Muslims and Tamils live here. All buses which travel from Fort, travel by this way. The Alexor International College is situated here.

References

Populated places in Western Province, Sri Lanka